The taekwondo competition in the 2005 Summer Universiade was held in İzmir, Turkey.

Medal overview

Men's events

Women's events

Medal table

2005 Summer Universiade
Universiade
2005